Befandriana-Nord or Befandriana-Avaratra (literally North Befandriana) is a district in northern Madagascar. It is a part of Sofia Region and borders the districts of Bealanana in north, Andapa to the northeast, Maroantsetra to the east, Mandritsara to the south, Boriziny-Vaovao (formerly Port-Bergé) to the southwest and Antsohihy to the north-west.

Communes
The district is further divided into 12 communes:

 Ambararata
 Ambodimotso-Atsimo
 Ambolidibe Est
 Ankarongana
 Antsakabary
 Antsakanalabe
 Befandriana-Avaratra
 Maroamalona
 Matsondana
 Morafeno
 Tsarahonenana
 Tsiamalao

Transport
The district is crossed by the Route nationale 32.

Nature
 Part of Makira Natural Park

References and notes

Districts of Sofia Region